Lactarius tesquorum is a member of the large milk-cap genus Lactarius in the order Russulales. It was described in 1979 by Georges Malençon based on collections from Morocco, but was later identified in other Mediterranean countries.

See also
List of Lactarius species

References

External links

tesquorum
Fungi described in 1979
Fungi of Africa
Fungi of Europe